"Lonely No More" is the first single from Matchbox Twenty frontman Rob Thomas' debut studio album, ...Something to Be (2005). It was released on February 14, 2005, and became his biggest solo hit to date. The song peaked at number one in Hungary, number three in Australia, number six on the US Billboard Hot 100, and number 11 on the UK Singles Chart.

Song information

The single was written by Thomas and produced by Matt Serletic. Although he was featured on Santana's "Smooth", "Lonely No More" is notable for being the proper solo debut single of Thomas. Starting over a series of chordless industrial rhythmic beats, the song sees Thomas explaining to a prospective romantic interest why he is not exactly comfortable heading into a relationship with her at the moment. Although she seems to know what to say to him, he points out that words are only words. She needs to show him something else, or even swear allegiance to reassure his insecurities. To explain exactly how hurt he has been in previous relationships, Thomas belts, "I don't wanna be lonely no more / I don't wanna have to pay for this / I don't want to know the lover at my door / Is just another heartache on my list".

The song was nominated for Best Male Pop Vocal Performance at the 2006 Grammys. In March 2014, British group Rixton interpolated portions of the song for their single "Me and My Broken Heart".

Music video
The official music video for "Lonely No More" was directed by Joseph Kahn. Thomas can be seen in various scenes as they shift or fold violently into each other (while Thomas remains immobile) from being his bedroom, to a nightclub, and to an office. Although the shifting scenes and objects seem to move by themselves, at one point Thomas can be physically prodding them to move. The video does try to incorporate some elements of the loneliness of "Lonely No More" by showing Thomas looking forlorn in a paparazzi scene and expressing mixed feelings about some girls in the video.

Awards and nominations

APRA Awards
The APRA Awards are presented annually from 1982 by the Australasian Performing Right Association (APRA).

|-
| 2006 || "Lonely No More" (Rob Thomas) – Rob Thomas || Most Performed Foreign Work ||

Track listings

Australian and European maxi-CD single
 "Lonely No More" – 3:47
 "Lonely No More" (acoustic) – 4:03
 "Fallen" – 4:36

UK CD single
 "Lonely No More" (album version)
 "Lonely No More" (acoustic)

UK DVD single
 "Lonely No More" (album version audio) – 3:46
 "Lonely No More" (Dolby 5.1 surround sound mix audio) – 3:46
 "Fallen" (audio) – 4:36
 "Lonely No More" (video) – 3:36
 "Lonely No More" (teaser video clip) – 1:29

Credits and personnel
Credits are adapted from the Australian CD single liner notes and the ...Something to Be booklet.

Studios
 Recorded at The Hit Factory (New York City), BiCoastal Music (Ossining, New York), Conway Studios, and Henson Studios (Los Angeles)
 Mixed at The Hit Factory (New York City)
 Mastered at Gateway Mastering (Portland, Maine, US)

Personnel

 Rob Thomas – writing, vocals
 Wendy Melvoin – guitar
 Jeff Trott – guitar
 Mike Elizondo – bass
 Matt Serletic – keys, production
 Gerald Heyward – drums
 Greater Anointing – background vocals
 Jimmy Douglass – recording, mixing
 Greg Collins – recording
 Mark Dobson – recording, digital editing
 Tony Maserati – additional mixing
 John O'Brien – programming
 Bob Ludwig – mastering
 Ria Lewerke – art direction
 Norman Moore – art direction
 Mark Seliger – photography

Charts

Weekly charts

Year-end charts

Sales and certifications

Release history

See also
 List of Adult Top 40 number-one songs of the 2000s
 List of number-one dance singles of 2005 (U.S.)
 List of Billboard Adult Contemporary number ones of 2005 and 2006

References

2005 singles
APRA Award winners
Atlantic Records singles
Funk rock songs
Music videos directed by Joseph Kahn
Number-one singles in Poland
Number-one singles in Hungary
Rob Thomas (musician) songs
Song recordings produced by Matt Serletic
Songs about loneliness
Songs written by Rob Thomas (musician)